Cambridge is a civil parish in Queens County, New Brunswick, Canada.

For governance purposes it was divided (before 2023) between the village of Cambridge-Narrows and the local service district of the parish of Cambridge, both of which were members of Regional Service Commission 11 (RSC11).

Origin of name
The parish was "said to" have been named in honour of the Duke of Cambridge, who died in 1850.

History
Cambridge was erected in 1852 from Johnston, Waterborough, and Wickham Parishes.

In 1856 the boundary with Johnston and Waterborough Parishes was altered.

Boundaries
Cambridge Parish is bounded:

on the east by a line beginning at Mill Cove on Grand Lake, then running along Fowler Road, Route 715, and the public landing southwest of Fowlers Cove to Washademoak Lake;
on the southeast by Washademoak Lake;
on the west by Colwells Creek and the Saint John River;
on the northwest by a line beginning on the Saint John River about 75 metres downstream of the Route 2 interchange with Route 105 and Conservation Road, then running north-northeasterly across the isthmus to Grand Lake, then up Grand Lake to Mill Cove;
including most of Thatch Island, which is now a peninsula.

Communities
Communities at least partly within the parish; bold indicates an incorporated municipality

Cherry Hill
Jemseg
Lower Cambridge
Lower Jemseg
Mill Cove
Scovil
Whites Cove
Cambridge-Narrows
Central Cambridge
Lakeview
McDonald Corner

Bodies of water
Bodies of water at least partly in the parish:

Jemseg River
Saint John River
Colwells Creek
Trout Creek
Lawson Passage
Raft Channel
Dykeman Lake
Foshay Lake
Grand Lake
Little Lake
Washademoak Lake

Islands
Islands in the parish:
Coreys Island
Huestis Island
Nevers Island
Thatch Island

Demographics
Parish population total does not include portion within former incorporated village of Cambridge-Narrows. Revised census figures based on the 2023 local governance reforms have not been released.

Population
Population trend

Language
Mother tongue  (2016)

Access Routes
Highways and numbered routes that run through the parish, including external routes that start or finish at the parish limits:

Highways

Principal Routes

Secondary Routes:

External Routes:
None

See also
List of parishes in New Brunswick

Notes

References

Parishes of Queens County, New Brunswick
Local service districts of Queens County, New Brunswick